I'm Movin' On or I'm Moving On may refer to:

 "I'm Movin' On" (Rascal Flatts song)
 "I'm Moving On" (Hank Snow song)
 "I'm Moving On" (Scott Cain song)
 "I'm Moving On" (Yoko Ono song)
 "I'm Moving On", a song by B.B. King on his There Is Always One More Time album
 I'm Movin' On (Jimmy Smith album)
 I'm Movin' On (CeCe Peniston album)

See also 
 Movin' On (disambiguation)